The Woodsmith Mine Tunnel (also known as a Mineral Transport System [MTS]) is a  long tunnel that will stretch between Woodsmith Mine at Sneatonthorpe near Whitby in North Yorkshire and the Wilton International complex on Teesside, England. The tunnel has been in development since 2016, but cutting of the tunnel bore did not start until April 2019, with an expected finish date of 2021.

When finished, the tunnel will be the longest tunnel in the United Kingdom and will also house the longest conveyor in the UK. The estimated cost of the tunnel in November 2018 was £1.1 billion.

Background
York Potash Ltd put forward the idea of mining potash and polyhalite on the moors above Whitby in 2010. Originally, three options for moving the mineral out were considered; a pipeline, a tunnel or a railway. Whilst the intended end location is Wilton (for delivery to the Redcar Bulk Terminal [RBT]), the developers also considered the Ports of Hull and of Immingham to the south. However the geology south through the Yorkshire Wolds was prohibitive for tunnelling as the chalk bedrock carries aquifers that are important for the region and would also need extra access/ventilation shafts, create more overburden and be of a significant extra cost than a shorter tunnel to Teesside.

Transporting the product out via a railway line involved crossing the River Esk at Larpool Viaduct, and then along the Esk Valley Line via two reversals in Whitby to gain the route towards Middlesbrough.

A pipeline would have involved turning the potash and polyhalite into a slurry which would have required a more labour and technically enhanced process at both ends of the transport system. A pipeline would also be above ground and cause a lot of environmental damage.

Both the pipeline and rail options were dropped in favour of a tunnel with conveyors in it during the planning stages, and through various submissions, the accepted plan was approved in June 2015. The company, now Sirius Minerals, agreed to pay £130 million to the North York Moors National Park Authority to "protect and enhance the environment". This would be over the whole life of the project.

To avoid damaging aquifers across the route, the tunnel is designed to stay deep within the Redcar Mudstone Formation. The Redcar Mudstone Formation is less permeable to water and the route also avoids any former ironstone workings in the Redcar and Cleveland area.

The cost of the tunnel was estimated at £1.1 billion in November 2018, and when complete, the tunnel will be the longest that is wholly within the United Kingdom. The conveyor will be robust enough to transport between 10 and 20 million tonnes of polyhalite when the mine is in full production with the raw mineral being transported to Teesside for granulation and onward shipping.

Construction

In July 2016, the UK Government awarded Sirius Minerals a Development Consent Order for the harbour facilities on Teesside. At that time, a different developer was shortlisted for the work on the tunnel which was also envisaged as needing five Tunnel Boring Machines (TBMs). This was later downgraded to three TBMs.
  
Whilst preparatory work was started in 2016, a ceremony to "break ground" at the Wilton site was held in June 2018 with Jake Berry, the MP for the Northern Powerhouse project. In February 2019, the first of three TBMs (was delivered to the Wilton site via Teesport. The first TBM, named Stella Rose after a naming competition with local schoolchildren, started boring in early April 2019. A spokesperson for Sirius Minerals commented on the tunnel stating that "we’re actually tunnelling in a rock that is relatively easy to cut, from a tunnelling point of view. It’s also relatively stable, and we’re not going through any cross measures; we’re not going from one geological horizon to another, which is where tunnels normally have more issues."

The tunnelling contract was split into three sections; Drive 1 was from Wilton to Lockwood Beck, Drive 2 was from Lockwood Beck southwards and Drive 3 was from Woodsmith Mine to Lockwood Beck northwards. Initially, an Austrian company, Strabag, were awarded the first tunnelling contract for the  section from Wilton to Lockwood Beck. The TBMs will process through the route tunnelling at the front of the machine, whilst the middle and rear sections add concrete lining to the tunnel walls.

Three ventilation shafts will be constructed: at Lady Cross Plantation, near Egton, at Lockwood Beck, and at Tocketts Lythe. Lady Cross Plantation is within the North York Moors National Park whilst the other two sites are outside the park and are located within Redcar and Cleveland. The access and ventilation shafts are planned to be  in diameter.

The shaft at Tocketts Lythe will be smaller than the others as it is not envisaged to have a conveyor transfer. Lockwood Beck and Lady Cross plantation will be larger caverns to accommodate the crossover in conveyors and for the passing of maintenance trains. Lockwood Beck would also need a larger diameter shaft as it will be a setting off site for one of the TBMs.

By the end of July 2020, the length of tunnel that had been dug out had reached . Concrete segments to line the tunnel were produced in a special factory inside the Wilton International Complex, however, at least 3,000 segments needed to be imported due to the tunnel boring machine making greater progress than anticipated for. By early December 2020,  had been tunnelled, and by June 2021,  had been tunnelled, and most of the shafts had been dug out.

Route
The tunnel will run in a north westerly direction from the Woodsmith Mine site, passing under the River Esk, the Esk Valley railway line, the A169 and then up across the Esk Valley to its first ventilation/access Point at Lady Cross Plantation. It then crosses moorland and runs alongside the A171 road for some distance crossing under it just south of Lockwood Beck reservoir where the second access point is. It then turns in a more north/north westerly direction through Tocketts Wood and under first the A173 road and then the A174 until it arrives at the Materials Handling Facility (MHF) at Wilton. After granulation, the finished product will be taken on another conveyor (this time above ground) to the export site at Redcar Bulk Terminal.

The company claim that the entire route does not travel under any housing, but it does come close to some barns.

Details

Length - 
Overall diameter - 
Internal diameter - 
Minimum depth - 
Average depth - 
Maximum depth - 
Width of conveyor belt - 
Speed of conveyor - 
Gauge of maintenance railway - 

The overall diameter of the tunnel will be . This also increased the cost of the whole project (including sinking the mineshafts) from £3.6 billion to £4.2 billion. The average depth of the tunnel will be  as it makes its way north eastwards towards Wilton. The company stated that this will allow for minimal visual and environmental impact as well as avoiding any significant construction obstacles on the way.

The Mineral Transport System (MTS) will consist of the longest underground conveyor in the world. The tunnel will also include an access railway for maintenance crews, an 11 kilovolt power system for the conveyor, fibre optic cables, a pumping main and a 66 kilovolt feeder cable to supply the mine site from Wilton. This is needed as there are no National Grid powers sources near to the mine site.

Planning documents assume the gauge of the railway to be , and the caverns where the crossovers are located will also be furnished with sidings. A train maintenance depot will be sited at the Wilton end of the tunnel.

See also
List of longest tunnels
List of tunnels by location

Notes

References

Sources

External links

Schematic of tunnel route hosted on Construction Enquirer
TBM Naming ceremony, hosted on Youtube

Tunnels in North Yorkshire
North Yorkshire
North York Moors
Mining in North Yorkshire